mesh conference is a Web 2.0 conference hosted in Toronto, Ontario, Canada. It is held annually in May, at the MaRS Centre in downtown Toronto. The conference, founded in 2006, has featured several prominent keynote speakers, including Om Malik (2006), Michael Arrington (2007), Michael Geist (2006, 2008), and David Miller (2009).

References

External links
 Official website

Web-related conferences